Ardrossan Harbour railway station is one of three remaining railway stations in the town of Ardrossan, North Ayrshire, Scotland. The station is managed by ScotRail and is owned by Network Rail. The station is an interchange for Caledonian MacBrayne ferry sailings to Brodick on the Isle of Arran.

History 
The station was originally opened on 19 January 1987 to replace the closed Ardrossan Winton Pier railway station.

Opened under sectorisation of British Rail, the station was served by ScotRail until the privatisation of British Rail.

The station is unstaffed and consists of a single platform and shelter, a short walk from the "CalMac" terminal building.

Services 
From the opening of the station, services generally only ran to connect with the CalMac sailings to Brodick.

2018:There is an hourly service for most of the day to/from Glasgow Central with a few extras during peak hours, A limited service of 5 departures and 4 arrivals operates on Sundays. There is no late evening service after 2200 with the last services terminating at the nearby Ardrossan Town.

Prior to May 2009, Only 5 trains per day operated to/from the station to connect with the ferry to Brodick, All other trains terminated at the nearby Ardrossan Town.

Ferry services
A ferry, operated by Caledonian MacBrayne, sails from Ardrossan Harbour to Brodick. In Summer 2013 a service to Campbeltown was provided on Thursday and Friday evenings, returning on Friday and Saturday mornings, with a return trip on Sundays.

References

Notes

Sources

External links
 Video footage of Ardrossan Harbour Station in 2016

Railway stations in North Ayrshire
Railway stations opened by British Rail
Railway stations in Great Britain opened in 1987
Railway stations serving harbours and ports in the United Kingdom
SPT railway stations
Railway stations served by ScotRail
Ardrossan−Saltcoats−Stevenston